Whites Butte is a  prominence adjacent the course of the Colorado River near the beginning of the Western Grand Canyon, (west terminus of the South Rim). The butte lies at the terminus of Travertine Canyon, the adjacent canyon west of Hermit Canyon. The Boucher Trail which begins at Upper Hermit Canyon, courses the east base of Whites Butte to reach the Tonto Trail-(west), on the Tonto Platform, south side of the Colorado River.

Geology & Biology

The horizontal top of Whites Butte is a large platform of the cliff-forming Redwall Limestone, with vegetation growth. The east flank of the Redwall is slightly arcuate, and the prominence, upon the Redwall Limestone, is also arcuate, with a peak remainder of a pyramid-shaped, sloped Supai Group (4 of 4 geological units). The prominence is a minuscule cliff of Supai Group (unit  2), Manakacha Formation. Slope-forming slopes of Watahomigi Formation are below the high point of cliffs of Manachaka, which protect the slopes, and help form the pyramidal shape of the prominence.

See also
 Cope Butte
 Supai Group, Manakacha Formation

References

External links

 Aerial view, Whites Butte, Mountainzone
 Climbing Whites Butte: Themtsarecalling.com

Buttes of Arizona
Grand Canyon
Grand Canyon National Park
Landforms of Coconino County, Arizona
North American 1000 m summits
Grand Canyon, South Rim
Grand Canyon, South Rim (west)